Fatih Ozmen is a Turkish-American aerospace engineer, entrepreneur, former cyclist, the co-owner and CEO of Sierra Nevada Corporation (SNC).

Early life and education
Born in Turkey, the former Turkish National Cycling Champion rode alongside top Turkish cyclists throughout the 1970s including the 1977 Tour de L'avenir in France. Fatih Ozmen pursued higher education in the United States receiving a M.S. Degree in Electrical Engineering from the University of Nevada, Reno. He went on to obtain a masters, with a thesis on navigation and landing systems.

Career
Ozmen started at Sierra Nevada Corporation as an engineering intern in 1981; during his early years at the company, he helped develop numerous systems and managed several key programs. In 1994, Fatih Ozmen and his wife Eren Ozmen acquired Sierra Nevada Corporation. Under the Ozmens, SNC has completed 19 strategic acquisitions, and has expanded to 34 locations in 19 U.S. states, England, Germany and Turkey, with a workforce of over 3,000 personnel.

Fatih is a member of the National Space Council Users Advisory Group, established in 2018 under Vice President Mike Pence.

In 2017, Fatih and Eren Ozmen launched Ozmen Ventures, a $5 million venture capital fund headquartered in Reno.

Philanthropy
In 2014, Fatih and wife Eren donated $5 million to the University of Nevada, Reno’s College of Business to support entrepreneurial programs.

Awards and recognition

Personal
 Aviation Entrepreneurs of the Year
 Living Legends of Aviation
 "Ellis Island Medal of Honor"
 Top 10 Most Influential Turkish Americans, TurkOfAmerica
 Honorary Doctorate of Science – University of Nevada, Reno (2016) 
 On May 13, 2016, Fatih Ozmen delivered the keynote speech at the University of Nevada, Reno commencement ceremony.

References

21st-century American businesspeople
American aerospace businesspeople
American billionaires
American chairpersons of corporations
American philanthropists
American technology chief executives
Businesspeople in information technology
Space advocates
Turkish emigrants to the United States
Living people
Year of birth missing (living people)
Businesspeople from Reno, Nevada
University of Nevada, Reno alumni